The  St. Honoré cake, usually known by its French name gâteau St-Honoré, and also sometimes called St. Honoratus cake, is a pastry dessert named for the French patron saint of bakers and pastry chefs, Saint Honoré or Honoratus (d. 600 AD), Bishop of Amiens. It was invented in 1847 at the Chiboust bakery on Rue Saint-Honoré in Paris.

This classic French dessert is a circle of puff pastry at its base with a ring of pâte à choux piped on the outer edge. Small baked profiteroles are dipped in caramelized sugar and attached side by side on top of the circle of the pâte à choux. This base is traditionally filled with crème chiboust and finished with whipped cream using a special St. Honoré piping tip.

See also
 List of choux pastry dishes

References

Custard desserts
French pastries
Puff pastry
Choux pastry